Cowanshannock may refer to the following in the United States:

Places
Cowanshannock Township, Armstrong County, Pennsylvania
Cowanshannock, Pennsylvania

Streams
Cowanshannock Creek, a tributary of the Allegheny River
South Branch Cowanshannock Creek, a tributary of the above

See also